Charles Roberts may refer to:

People 
Charles W. Roberts (1828–1898), colonel in the Union Army during the American Civil War
Charles Henry Crompton-Roberts (1832–1891), British Member of the UK Parliament for Sandwich
Charles Boyle Roberts (1842–1899), U.S. Congressman from Maryland
Charles E. Roberts (1843–1934), engineer and inventor; client and patron of Frank Lloyd Wright
Charles James Roberts (1846–1925), publican, politician and Postmaster-General in New South Wales (Australia)
Charles Roberts (wood-engraver) (active 1870–98), British wood-engraver
Charles G. D. Roberts (1860–1943), Canadian poet and author
Charles Roberts (British politician) (1865–1959), British Liberal politician
Charles DuVal Roberts (1873–1966), United States Army Brigadier General and Medal of Honor recipient
Charles Church Roberts (1882–1957), United States Navy sailor and Medal of Honor recipient
Charlie Roberts (1883–1939), English footballer
Luckey Roberts (Charles Luckeyeth Roberts, 1887–1968), American composer and stride pianist
Charles Roberts (baseball) (born 1908), American Negro leagues baseball player
Charles Roberts (officer) (c. 1772–1816), British Army officer
Charles Roberts (priest) (died 1942), archdeacon of St Asaph, 1935–1942
Charles S. Roberts (1930–2010), boardgame creator and railroad historian
Pat Roberts (Charles Patrick Roberts, born 1936), U.S. senator
Charles Carl Roberts (1973–2006), gunman in the 2006 Amish school shooting
Chuck Roberts (born 1950), news anchor
Charles Roberts (Canadian football) (born 1979), Canadian football player
Charles Fyshe Roberts (1837–1914), Under-Secretary of Defence in colonial New South Wales
Charles Hubert Roberts (1865–1929), British surgeon, physician and lecturer

Companies 
Charles Roberts and Co., rolling stock factory works based in Horbury, UK

See also 
Charles Robartes, 2nd Earl of Radnor (1660–1723)

Roberts, Charles